Nelson is a city in Pickens and Cherokee Counties, Georgia, United States. At the 2020 census, the population was 1,145. It is part of the Atlanta metropolitan area.

History
The city is named for John Nelson, an early landowner, farmer, and rifle maker. The Georgia General Assembly incorporated Nelson as a town in 1891.

The area possesses substantial deposits of marble.  The construction of a railway in 1883 made the development of large-scale quarries possible.  The quality of the marble has made it favored for federal monuments.

On April 1, 2013, the city council voted unanimously to approve the "Family Protection Ordinance". Every head of household must own a gun and ammunition to "provide for the emergency management of the city" and to "provide for and protect the safety, security, and general welfare of the city and its inhabitants." Residents are not required to buy one if they do not have one, and the ordinance does not penalize anyone who does not comply. Convicted felons are exempt.

Geography
Nelson is located on the border of Pickens and Cherokee Counties at  (34.381562, -84.371303). The original city center is located in Pickens County, but the city limits have recently expanded southward so that more of the city is now located in Cherokee County.

Nelson is served through its downtown by the Georgia Northeastern Railroad, and by Canton Road, the town's main street and the former route of Georgia State Route 5. South on old 5 is Ball Ground, and north is Tate. The north end of Interstate 575 and south end of State Route 515 are at the county line just to the west of Nelson. I-575 leads south  to Atlanta, and SR 515 leads north  to Ellijay.

Demographics

2020 census

As of the 2020 United States census, there were 1,145 people, 523 households, and 383 families residing in the city.

2000 census
As of the census of 2000,  626 people, 254 households, and 188 families resided in the city. The 275 housing units averaged 305.3 per square mile (118.0/km). The racial makeup of the city was 89.94% White, 9.42% African American, 0.16% Native American, 0.16% Asian, and 0.32% from two or more races. Hispanics or Latinos of any race were 0.16% of the population.

Of the 254 households, 27.2% had children under the age of 18 living with them, 64.2% were married couples living together, 8.3% had a female householder with no husband present, and 25.6% were not families. About 22.4% of all households were made up of individuals, and 10.6% had someone living alone who was 65 years of age or older.  The average household size was 2.46 and the average family size was 2.88.

In the city, the population was distributed as 19.3% under the age of 18, 7.7% from 18 to 24, 28.9% from 25 to 44, 27.2% from 45 to 64, and 16.9% who were 65 years of age or older.  The median age was 42 years. For every 100 females, there were 93.2 males.  For every 100 females age 18 and over, there were 90.6 males.

The median income for a household in the city was $44,250, and for a family was $51,806. Males had a median income of $35,066 versus $30,450 for females. The per capita income for the city was $20,604.  About 1.1% of families and 3.7% of the population were below the poverty line, including 1.1% of those under age 18 and 8.5% of those age 65 or over.

The estimated median household income in 2008 was $56,361, compared to $50,861 for the state of Georgia. The estimated per capita income in 2008 was $26,140.

The estimated median house or condominium value in 2008 was $208,186, compared to $169,100 for the state of Georgia. The estimated median home value in Nelson was $110,800 in 2000. In 2008, the mean price for all housing units was $204,682, for detached houses $212,211, for townhouses or other attached units $147,212, and for mobile homes $54,519.

Notable person
Claude Akins, actor

References

Cities in Pickens County, Georgia
Cities in Cherokee County, Georgia
Cities in Georgia (U.S. state)